Pufnstuf (also known as Pufnstuf Zaps the World) is a 1970 American comedy fantasy musical film produced by Sid and Marty Krofft Enterprises and released by Universal Pictures. It is based on the children's television series H.R. Pufnstuf, a show that features a cast of puppets on a "living island."

Plot
After Jimmy is wrongfully ejected from the school band for tripping, he ventures on a journey with his newly magical talking flute Freddy. Orchestrated by Witchiepoo, Jimmy takes an evil boat to Living Island, an island where everything is alive. He befriends the island's inhabitants, who are led by Mayor H.R. Pufnstuf, but the evil Witchiepoo is determined to steal Freddy the Flute from him in order to impress the visiting Witches' Council and the Boss Witch so that she may win the Witch of the Year Award.

The witch steals the flute by disguising herself as a pretty dance instructor. Jimmy and his new friends recover the flute by having Gopher dig a tunnel to Witchiepoo's castle and faking a fire. Witchiepoo retaliates by bombing and destroying Pufnstuf's town. During the bombing, she is blown away by the west wind (portrayed as a cowboy head), which destroys her flying vehicle.

Jimmy is sorry for having endangered the Living Island inhabitants and leaves with his flute without telling them in order to prevent further danger. Witchiepoo returns to Pufnstuf's town and shrinks all of the inhabitants before casting them into her castle dungeon as prisoners. When Jimmy learns what has happened to the townspeople, he is resolved to save them.

Witchiepoo invites the Witches' Council for a convention and prepares Pufnstuf as the main meal. Jimmy disguises himself as a witch to enter with the other witches. Jimmy is exposed while trying to save Pufnstuf and is placed in the dungeon with the others.

Gopher digs into the dungeon to save them all, except for Pufnstuf, who will soon be cooked. Once back at the town, they plan a rescue. A book tells them that the only thing that scares witches is a good fairy angel. They all dress as white good fairy angels, raid the castle, scare off the Witches' Council and save Pufnstuf.

Witchiepoo is the only witch to discover that they had been faking, and she flies to try to catch the other witches to tell them to return. En route, her minion Orson sees the good guys at the town, and she orders him to use her doomsday bomb on them but also says to take the wheel. Orson accidentally drops the bomb inside the vehicle while taking the wheel, blowing the Vroom Broom apart and sending Witchiepoo and Orson plummeting to earth, lamenting yet another defeat.

During a closing musical number, Pufnstuf says, "When good friends pull together, they can do anything."

Cast

Voice cast
 Walker Edmiston - Dr. Blinky, Ludicrous Lion, Seymour Spider, Candle, Hippie Tree
 Joan Gerber - Madame Willow, Miss Wristwatch, Freddy the Flute (some scenes)
 Al Melvin - H.R. Pufnstuf, Heinrich Rat, Living Island Boat, Orville Pelican, Polka-Dotted Horse, Stupid Bat, West Wind
 Don Messick - Freddy the Flute, Googy Gopher, Orson Vulture

Production
Following the success of the H.R. Pufnstuf television series, the film was rushed into production for theatrical distribution, with filming beginning in January 1970. The film was financed by Universal Pictures and Kellogg's Cereal, also a sponsor of the television show.

Sid Krofft cast his next-door neighbor, singer Cass Elliot, as Witchiepoo's frenemy and bitter rival Witch Hazel. According to actress Joy Campbell McKenzie, Elliot was "very distant. Not rude or arrogant but she just didn't mingle, which most people were surprised about."

Martha Raye was cast as Boss Witch. The cast and crew expected Raye to behave as a diva, but she instead befriended those behind the scenes, even inviting them to dinner. However, Wild referred to Raye as "a right old cow." Raye's involvement in Pufnstuf led to her role as Benita Bizarre in the Kroffts' television show The Bugaloos.

Album
A soundtrack album was released on LP, cassette and 8-track in 1970 (Capitol/EMI Records SW-542), featuring the songs and the score by Charles Fox. A bootleg version of the LP was rereleased on CD in 2006 by El Records (ACMEM65CD). While the pressing is by a legitimate European company, the source tape is an unauthorized bootleg, noticeable for several loops added to various tracks.

Track listing
 "If I Could" - Jack Wild
 "Fire in the Castle"
 "Living Island" - Jack Wild/Cast
 "Witchiepoo's Lament"
 "Angel Raid"
 "A Friend In You" - Jack Wild
 "How Lucky I Am"
 "Pufnstuf" - Jack Wild/Cast
 "Charge"
 "Different" - Mama Cass Elliot
 "Zap The World" - Jack Wild, Billie Hayes, Martha Raye
 "Leaving Living Island"
 "Rescue Racer To The Rescue"
 "Finale:a) If I Could / b) Living Island" - Jack Wild

Note: The title song was covered by the Pickwick Children's Chorus on the album Sesame Street and Other Children's Pop Hits.

Home media
Pufnstuf was released to DVD on May 19, 2009 by Universal Studios Home Entertainment. It includes the original trailer of the film, and it is presented in its original widescreen presentation. It was later released to Blu-ray disc on September 21, 2021 by Code Red, also in widescreen and with the original trailer. The film is also available in digital media format.

Footnotes and references

See also
 List of American films of 1970

External links
 kiddiematinee.com: PUFNSTUF (1970, U.S.)
 
 
 

1970 films
1970s children's adventure films
1970s children's fantasy films
American fantasy adventure films
American children's adventure films
American children's fantasy films
Capitol Records soundtracks
Films based on television series
Puppet films
Films scored by Charles Fox
Films set in castles
Sid and Marty Krofft
Universal Pictures films
1970s English-language films
Films directed by Hollingsworth Morse
1970s American films